I'll Meet You There is a 2020 drama film written, directed and produced by Iram Parveen Bilal with co-producers Joy Ganes and Ilana Rossein. The film portrays a modern Pakistani-American family in Chicago, and stars Faran Tahir, Qavi Khan, Nikita Tewani, Sheetal Sheth, and Samrat Chakrabarti. It was nominated for the Narrative Feature Grand Jury Award at South by Southwest in 2020.

Plot 
Dua, a young Pakistani-American woman, dreams of becoming a professional dancer. Majeed, her father and a Chicago police officer, supports her dream. For her audition at Juilliard, Dua trains in Kathak dance, following in the footsteps of her deceased mother. An unexpected visit from Majeed's father from Pakistan causes Dua to reckon with her Americanization, brings reminders of her mother's death, and encourages Majeed to become more involved with the local mosque and Muslim community. But when a new assignment with the Chicago police requires Majeed to surveil his community members at the mosque, the consequences affect the entire family.

Cast 
 Faran Tahir as Majeed
 Qavi Khan as Baba
 Nikita Tewani as Dua
 Sheetal Sheth as Shonali
 Samrat Chakrabarti as Dr. Sahil Khan

Release
I'll Meet You There was originally set to have its world premiere at South by Southwest in March 2020; however, due to the COVID-19 pandemic, the film festival was cancelled. Instead, I'll Meet You There premiered in the US at the Bentonville Film Festival in August 2020, and its world premiere took place at the Los Angeles Asian Pacific Film Festival in September 2020.

In December 2020, Level Forward studios acquired distribution rights for the film in North America.
The film was rolled out in North America on February 3, 2021.

Ban in Pakistan
In March 2022, one week before the film's anticipated release in Pakistan, the Central Board of Film Censors announced that it had banned I'll Meet You There from showing in the country. The Board cited that the film "does not reflect true Pakistani culture" and "portrays a negative image of Muslims." The cast and filmmaker Bilal decried the censorship, with Bilal stating: "I respectfully disagree that there is just one notion of what Pakistan and Pakistani values are. When we ask the diaspora to contribute and donate, when we even care to enable them to vote in elections, then we should also include their troubles, identity struggles and issues as 'Pakistani.' Let’s please end the elitism that a nation or religion can only belong to a select few."

Reception

Critical response
The film has been described as a "departure from how Muslims and South Asians have typically been depicted in American cinema" for how supportive Majeed is of his daughter's agency as a young woman.

Accolades
The film was nominated for the Narrative Feature Grand Jury Award at South by Southwest in 2020. In 2021, the film was a recipient of a ReFrame Stamp for gender equality in hiring for a narrative feature film.

References

External links
 

2020s Urdu-language films
Films set in Chicago
Films about Islam
American coming-of-age drama films
Asian-American drama films
American independent films
American multilingual films
American dance films
2020 drama films
2020 independent films
Asian-American culture in Chicago
Films about Pakistani Americans
Film censorship in Pakistan
Film controversies in Pakistan
2020s American films